Manfred Donike (13 June 1960 – 23 February 2003) was a German cyclist. He competed in the points race event at the 1984 Summer Olympics. His father was also a cyclist and a noted chemist.

References

External links
 

1960 births
2003 deaths
German male cyclists
Olympic cyclists of West Germany
Cyclists at the 1984 Summer Olympics
People from Erftstadt
Sportspeople from Cologne (region)
Cyclists from North Rhine-Westphalia